La Commune (Paris, 1871) is a 2000 historical drama film directed by Peter Watkins about the Paris Commune. A historical re-enactment in the style of a documentary, the film received much acclaim from critics for its political themes and Watkins' direction.

Production
La Commune (Paris, 1871) has been noted for its very large cast. It is mainly non-professional, including many immigrants from North Africa. Members did much of their own research for the project. Watkins once said of the film, "The Paris Commune has always been severely marginalized by the French education system, despite - or perhaps because - it is a key event in the history of the European working class, and when we first met, most of the cast admitted that they knew little or nothing about the subject. It was very important that the people become directly involved in our research on the Paris Commune, thereby gaining an experiential process in analyzing those aspects of the current French system which are failing in their responsibility to provide citizens with a truly democratic and participatory process."

Filming
La Commune (Paris, 1871) was shot in just 13 days in an abandoned factory on the outskirts of Paris.

Like many of Watkins' later films, it is quite lengthy - a long cut runs 5 hours and 45 minutes, though the more common version is 3 and a half hours long. The long version is available on DVD. The making of La Commune (Paris, 1871) was documented in the 2001 National Film Board of Canada film The Universal Clock: The Resistance of Peter Watkins, directed by Geoff Bowie.

Critical reception
La Commune (Paris, 1871) received general acclaim from film critics. Review aggregator Rotten Tomatoes reports 100% approval with an average rating of 8/10. On Metacritic, the film holds a mean score of 90/100, indicating "universal acclaim."

J. Hoberman of Sight & Sound magazine wrote, "Watkins restages history in its own ruins, uses the media as a frame, and even so, manages to imbue his narrative with amazing presence. No less than the event it chronicles, La Commune is a triumph of spontaneous action." Jonathan Rosenbaum called it Watkins' "latest magnum opus." Dave Kehr, writing for The New York Times, called it "essential viewing for anyone interested in taking an exploratory step outside the Hollywood norms."

In 2016, Michael Atkinson of The Village Voice listed it as the greatest film since 2000.

See also 
List of longest films by running time

References

Bibliography

External links
 Notes on La Commune from Peter Watkins' website
 
 La Commune Paris 1871 at the NFB
 Peter Watkins’ La Commune commentary at The Soche.

2000 films
French black-and-white films
2000s French-language films
Films directed by Peter Watkins
Films about the Paris Commune
2000 drama films
French drama films
2000s French films